Somália is a nickname, and may refer to:

Wanderson de Paula Sabino (born 1977), nicknamed Somália, Brazilian striker
Paulo Rogério Reis Silva (born 1984), nicknamed Somália, Brazilian footballer
Wergiton do Rosario Calmon (born 1988), nicknamed Somália, Brazilian professional footballer

See also
Somalia, a country in the Horn of Africa